Seaton Valley is a civil parish at the south eastern corner of Northumberland, consisting of four villages lying between Cramlington, Blyth and Whitley Bay. The largest village is Seaton Delaval, while Seaton Sluice is on the coast; the other two are Seghill and New Hartley.  It takes its name from Seaton Burn, a small river which flows through the area.

It was preceded by the Seaton Valley Urban District which existed until 1974, but has different boundaries; the urban district contained Cramlington, but did not contain Seaton Sluice which was then part of Borough of Whitley Bay.

The community council consists of nine elected members:

 Susan Dungworth (chair)
 Graham Eastwood (vice chair)
 David Ferguson
 Jill Henderson
 Les Bowman
 Eva Coulson
 Ann Stanners
 Sue Bowman
 Eve Chicken

References

External links
 

Civil parishes in Northumberland